Potamilus metnecktayi, the Salina mucket, is a species of freshwater mussel, an aquatic bivalve mollusc in the family Unionidae, the river mussels.

This species is endemic to the United States.

References

Molluscs of the United States
metnecktayi
Molluscs described in 1998
Taxonomy articles created by Polbot
Taxobox binomials not recognized by IUCN